Live in Brazil is an EP by Brazilian hard rock band Dr. Sin. It was released only in Japan with the album Double LIVE! by Yngwie Malmsteen. The Swedish guitarist loved the opening show in Brazil and decided to launch the Japanese version of Double LIVE! with one EP with four of Dr. Sin's songs performed live. Yngwie Malmsteen & Dr. Sin sold 50,000 records in Japan in its first week of release.

Track listing

Personnel 
 Andria Busic – bass/lead vocals
 Ivan Busic – drums/backing vocals
 Eduardo Ardanuy – guitars

References

Dr. Sin albums
1998 live albums